Oscar Segers (born 3 October 1960) is a Belgian wrestler. He competed in the men's freestyle 68 kg at the 1980 Summer Olympics.

References

1960 births
Living people
Belgian male sport wrestlers
Olympic wrestlers of Belgium
Wrestlers at the 1980 Summer Olympics
Place of birth missing (living people)
20th-century Belgian people